The 1996 Challenge Cup was the 95th staging of the Challenge Cup tournament. Known as the Silk Cut Challenge Cup due to sponsorship from Silk Cut, it was the first Challenge Cup of the summer era. The tournament featured 40 teams playing 42 games, the culmination of which was the final at London's Wembley Stadium between Super League I teams St. Helens and Bradford Bulls.

Prize money
The following is a table of prize amounts received by each club depending on which round of the Challenge Cup was reached. No prizes were awarded in the first two rounds of the competition, but amateur clubs who reached the Third Round each received £1,000.

First round

Second round

Third round

Fourth round

Fifth round

Quarter-final

Semi finals

Final

The 1996 tournament's final featured Super League clubs St. Helens and Bradford Bulls, and was played on Saturday, 27 April  at London's Wembley Stadium before a crowd of 78,550. The match was refereed by Stuart Cummings and at half time Bradford led 14-12. Trailing 26-12 from the 53rd to the 57th minute, St Helens overcame this 14-point deficit, the biggest in Challenge Cup final history for a winning team, to prevail by 40-32. This also made it the highest-scoring Challenge Cup final in history.

Bradford's 32 points set a new record for most points scored in a Challenge Cup final-losing team. Bradford's scrum half back, Robbie Paul, became the fourth player ever to achieve what was a Challenge Cup final record of three tries, and was awarded the Lance Todd Trophy for man-of-the-match.

See also
Super League I

References

Challenge Cup
St Helens R.F.C.
Challenge Cup